Zennewijnen is a hamlet in the Dutch province of Gelderland. It is a part of the municipality of Tiel, and lies about 3 km south of Tiel.

It was first mentioned in 850 as Sinuinum. The etymology in unclear. The Premonstratensian monastery Mariënschoot was located near Zennewijnen since the 13th century and a site for pilgrimage. In 1372, the monastery burnt down and was demolished in 1572. In 1840, it was home to 171 people. There is a still a brickworks in Zennewijnen.

Gallery

References

Populated places in Gelderland
Tiel